Rostkovia is a genus of plant in family Juncaceae described as a genus in 1809.

The genus is native to Ecuador, southern South America, New Zealand, and various antarctic and subantarctic islands.

 Species
 Rostkovia magellanica (Lam.) Hook.f. - South Island of New Zealand, Antipodes Islands, Ecuador, southern Chile, southern Argentina, Falkland Islands, South Georgia Islands
 Rostkovia tristanensis Christoph. - Tristan da Cunha

 Formerly included
moved to other genera: Marsippospermum Patosia 
 Rostkovia brevifolia Phil. - Patosia clandestina (Phil.) Buchenau
 Rostkovia clandestina Phil. - Patosia clandestina (Phil.) Buchenau
 Rostkovia gracilis Hook.f. 1844. - Marsippospermum gracile (Hook.f.) Buchenau
 Rostkovia gracilis Phil. 1858 - Marsippospermum philippii (Buchenau) Hauman
 Rostkovia grandiflora (L.f.) Hook.f. - Marsippospermum grandiflorum (L.f.) Hook.
 Rostkovia novae-zelandiae Buchanan - Marsippospermum gracile (Hook.f.) Buchenau
 Rostkovia reichei (Buchenau) Hosseus - Marsippospermum reichei Buchenau

References

Juncaceae
Poales genera
Taxonomy articles created by Polbot